Terekhino is a rural locality (a village) in Yenangskoye Rural Settlement, Kichmengsko-Gorodetsky District, Vologda Oblast, Russia. The population was 11 as of 2002.

Geography 
Terekhino is located 52 km east of Kichmengsky Gorodok (the district's administrative centre) by road. Nizhny Yegansk is the nearest rural locality.

References 

Rural localities in Kichmengsko-Gorodetsky District